Gregory Leskiw (born 5 August 1946) is a Canadian guitarist best known for playing guitar with the Guess Who from 1970 to 1972.

History
Born in Brandon, Manitoba and raised in Shilo, Leskiw's father was a jazz guitarist who toured Manitoba in the 1930s and 1940s. Leskiw began playing the guitar at the age of 12, initially learning jazz standards and jazz chords from his father. Through Leskiw's high school years he played in Winnipeg rock bands The Shags, Logan Avenue, and Wild Rice. By 1969 Wild Rice dissolved, and in mid-1970 he joined The Guess Who, as he and guitarist Kurt Winter both replaced the departed Randy Bachman. Leskiw wrote "One Divided" which appeared on the 1971 Guess Who album So Long, Bannatyne. After a few albums with The Guess Who, Leskiw left the band in March 1972, and then formed the band Mood jga jga. In the late 1970s and early 1980s he was a member of Crowcuss and Kilowatt, both with another Guess Who alumnus, bassist Bill Wallace. From 1986 to 1997, Leskiw operated Vox Pop Studios in Fort Garry, a popular recording studio for local Winnipeg groups such as Crash Test Dummies, New Meanies, and Mood jga jga.

Discography

The Guess Who
 1970:  Share the Land
 1971:  Best of The Guess Who
 1971:  So Long, Bannatyne
 1972:  Rockin'
 1974:  The Best of the Guess Who, Vol. 2
 1977:  The Greatest Hits of the Guess Who
 1997:  The Guess Who: The Ultimate Collection
 1999:  The Guess Who: Greatest Hits
 2003:  Platinum & Gold Collection: The Guess Who
 2003:  The Guess Who: Anthology

Mood jga jga
 1974:  Mood jga jga (Warner Bros.)
 1997:  Boys Will Be Boys

Les Q
 1979:  Be My Champion (SL Records/CBS)

Kilowatt
 1982:  Kilowatt (Dallcorte Records)
1983:  Currents

One Eyed Jacks

 1993:  Hell on Hold

Swing Soniq
 1998:  Moonglow
 2005:  Love Wild

References

Sources
The Guess Who Artistfacts

External links
CanadianBands.com entry
Works by Greg Leskiw at Library and Archives Canada
Works by or about Greg Leskiw in libraries (WorldCat catalogue)

1947 births
Canadian songwriters
Canadian rock guitarists
Canadian male guitarists
Living people
Musicians from Winnipeg
Writers from Winnipeg
20th-century Canadian guitarists
21st-century Canadian guitarists
20th-century Canadian male musicians
21st-century Canadian male musicians